Lee Rose (born July 30, 1955) is an American lighting designer that works in the mediums of film, television, stage, and concerts.

Early life
Lee Rose began his career as a lighting technician and designer in the theatre, working in both stage theatre and dance. During the mid-1970s, Rose also began working as a lighting designer and technician for rock concerts. His first major concert was the design of the lighting for the band Atlantis Philharmonic, which opened for Styx in 1974. Rose remained on the road for ten years, touring with various groups until 1984. That year, Rose started a TV/film lighting design company called Ocean, Rose & Associates with fellow lighting designer Richard Ocean. He stayed with the company until 1998, when Rose joined Design Partners, Inc and became a partner with the firm. Design Partner, Inc. dissolved in December 2015 and starting in January 2016 Rose formed Lee Rose Designs to continue his lighting design work.

Television
The first Ocean, Rose & Associates production was the lighting design for the 1st Annual Black Gold Awards in September 1984, produced by Dick Clark Productions. Following their success with this performance, Dick Clark Productions hired the firm to design the lighting for New Years Rockin’ Eve and the Golden Globe Awards. Rose has remained the lighting designer for New Years Rockin' Eve ever since his debut in 1985, over a span of more than 30 years. During that time Rose has also served as lighting designer for other awards shows including the Golden Gods, the 2011 Daytime Emmy Awards, the American Latino Media Arts Awards, the Clio Awards, and the Soap Opera Digest Awards. The Golden Globes represents the awards show he has been involved with for the most number of years.

Television events that Rose has served as lighting designer for include Jerry Lewis Muscular Dystrophy Association (MDA) Labor Day Telethon, which Rose transitioned to a new format under its current name the "MDA Show of Strength"; the Disney Channel Games, YAMMA Pit Fighting, Live! With Kelly and Michael, Walt Disney World Christmas Day Parade, We Got to Do Better, Sit Down Comedy with David Steinberg, The Naked Trucker and T-Bones Show, Larry King Live, Last Comic Standing, Great Pretenders, Greed, Your Big Break, the Keenen Ivory Wayans Show, as well as sporting events for the first thirteen official events of the UFC in the mid-1990s. He was also lighting designer on the films Southland Tales, Bringing Down the House, Vanilla Sky, and Almost Famous. His work in the movies Almost Famous and Vanilla Sky with director of photography John Toll was covered by American Cinematographer magazine, which detailed his lighting design and how his work on the production helped to bring a feeling of reality to complex indoor scenarios.

Rose has served as lighting director for television broadcasts including Chelsea Lately, Tosh.0, Nick Cannon: Mr. Show Biz, Eddie Griffin: You Can Tell 'Em I Said It!, Dogg After Dark, the Wayne Brady Show, D.C. Follies, and Zoobilee Zoo. He has also served as a cinematographer on television shows including Christopher Titus: Neverlution, Nick Cannon: Mr. Show Biz, and Eddie Griffin: You Can Tell 'Em I Said It!.

Later concerts
Rose first filmed a major touring show in 1985, when they video recorded a Phil Collins show at the Royal Albert Hall. Additional concerts that Rose filmed include videos for Iron Maiden, Jimmy Buffett, The Hooters, Van Halen, American Bandstand, Gloria Estefan, Roy Orbison, and Garth Brooks.

Honors
Rose has been nominated for two Emmy Awards for concert collaborations with Yanni: a nomination for Outstanding Individual Achievement in Lighting Direction (electronic) for a Drama Series, Variety Series, Miniseries, or Movie in 1994 for his work on Yanni Live at the Acropolis and a nomination for Outstanding Lighting Direction (electronic) for a Drama Series, Variety Series, Miniseries, or Movie in 1998 for his work on Yannis' Tribute. In 1997, Rose was named Lighting Dimensions' Lighting Designer of the Year.

References

External links
 Official Website
 Official biography 
 

1955 births
American cinematographers
American lighting designers
Living people
Place of birth missing (living people)